This is a list of mammals of Massachusetts. It includes all mammals currently living in Massachusetts, whether resident or as migrants. For the most part, it does not include each mammal's specific habitat, but instead shows the mammal's range in the state and its abundance.

Chiroptera (bats) 

In 2008, white nose syndrome was recorded in Massachusetts. Afterwards, the bat population declined by 98%, and thus, in 2012, the little brown myotis, northern long-eared myotis, and tricolored bat were listed as endangered in the state.

Carnivora (carnivorans)

Cetacea (cetaceans)

Artiodactyla (even-toed ungulates)

Lagomorpha (rabbits and hares)

Didelphimorphia (New World opossums)

Rodentia (rodents)

Eulipotyphla (shrews and moles)

See also 
 Mammals of New England
 List of Massachusetts birds
 List of reptiles of Massachusetts
 List of mammal genera
 Lists of mammals by region
 List of mammals in Connecticut
 List of mammals in North America

References 

 Kays, R. W., and Wilson, D. W., Mammals of North America, Princeton University Press, 
 Wilson, D. E., and Reeder, D. M. (eds) Mammal Species of the World, 3rd edition, Johns Hopkins University Press. .
 Smithsonian National Museum of Natural History Mammals of North America
 Mammal List of Massachusetts Cardoza, J. E., Jones, G. S., and French, T. W.

External links 
 American Society of Mammalogists

Massachusetts
Mammals